Pragyasundari Devi (born 1872 – died 1950), also seen as Pragyasundari Debi, Pragya Sundari Devi, Pragasundari Debi, or Prajnasundari Bezbaroa, was an Indian cookbook author and magazine editor. Her Amish O Niramish Ahar was a "significant" early cookbook in the Bengali language.

Early life
Pragyasundari Devi was the daughter of scientist Hemendranath Tagore and the sister of Purnima Devi. Her grandfather was philosopher Debendranath Tagore and her great-grandfather was industrialist Dwarkanath Tagore. Nobel laureate and poet Rabindranath Tagore was her uncle. Other kin in the extended Tagore family included her aunt, novelist Swarnakumari Devi, her uncle, philosopher Dwijendranath Tagore, another uncle, civil servant Satyendranath Tagore, and another uncle, artist Jyotirindranath Tagore. Indian feminist Sarala Devi Chaudhurani was her first cousin.

Career
Her first cookbook, sometimes called "the first cookbook in Bengali", Amish O Niramish Ahar, was published in 1902. She warned readers in this first volume the home cook that “Spending a lot of money is no guarantee for good food," as she encouraged the efficient use of inexpensive vegetables. She published a second vegetarian cookbook, and later two more cookbooks that included some meat dishes. Her later cookbooks focused on the cookery of Assam and on pickles and preserves.

Beginning in 1897, Pragyasundari Devi edited a women's magazine, Punya, which included recipes.

Personal life
Pragyasundari Devi married Lakshminath Bezbaroa, an Assamese-language writer and literary agent in 1891. They had four daughters, one whom died very young, five granddaughters and one grandson, and eleven great-grandchildren. He encouraged her to publish her recipes in book form. Pragyasundari Devi died in 1950. Ira Ghosh, her granddaughter, wrote a biographical introduction to a recent edition of Amish O Niramish Ahar, and updated it with more current measurements and directions. Another granddaughter, Ritha Devi, was a well-known Odissi dancer.

References

1950 deaths
1872 births
19th-century Bengalis
Bengali Hindus
20th-century Bengalis
Indian women editors
Indian editors
Bengali cuisine
Tagore family
Indian food writers
Bengali-language writers
20th-century Indian journalists
Indian women journalists
Year of birth uncertain
Indian writers
Indian magazine editors
20th-century Indian writers
20th-century Indian women writers
Women writers from West Bengal
People from Kolkata